Giancarlo Lopes Rodrigues (born 14 January 1990), known simply as Giancarlo, is a Brazilian footballer who plays as a forward for Bangladesh Premier League club Sheikh Russel KC.

Honours

Club 
Vitória
 Campeonato Baiano: 2013

References

External links
 

1990 births
Living people
Brazilian footballers
Association football forwards
Brazilian expatriate footballers
Expatriate footballers in Malaysia
Malaysia Super League players
Petaling Jaya City FC players
PKNP FC players